"" is the eleventh single by Japanese singer Angela Aki, released on June 8, 2011.

Track listing

References

External links 
 Official Discography 

2011 singles
Angela Aki songs
Japanese-language songs
2011 songs
Songs written by Angela Aki